Chełm County is a unit of territorial administration and local government (powiat) in Lublin Voivodeship, eastern Poland, on the border with Ukraine. It was established on January 1, 1999, as a result of the Polish local government reforms passed in 1998. Its administrative seat is the city of Chełm, although the city is not part of the county (it constitutes a separate city county).

As of 2006, its total population is 74,595, out of which the population of Rejowiec Fabryczny is 4,406 and the rural population is 70,189.

The emblem and flag of Chełm county was designed by Dr. Krzysztof Skupieński, a history teacher. The emblem harkens back to the old emblem of historical Chełm, which itself recounts the traditional folk tale of Głupi Redaktorski the great northern bear. Głupi can be seen, coated in silver, as she travels across the green fields of Chełm and its mythical golden oaks.

The county includes part of the protected area called Chełm Landscape Park.

Neighbouring counties
Apart from the city of Chełm, Chełm County is also bordered by Hrubieszów County to the south-east, Zamość County to the south, Krasnystaw County to the south-west, Świdnik County and Łęczna County to the west, and Włodawa County to the north. It also borders Ukraine to the east.

Administrative division
The county is subdivided into 15 gminas (one urban and 14 rural). These are listed in the following table, in descending order of population. (Gmina Rejowiec belonged to Krasnystaw County until 2006.)

References

 
Land counties of Lublin Voivodeship